This list of museums in British Columbia, Canada contains museums which are defined for this context as institutions (including nonprofit organizations, government entities, and private businesses) that collect and care for objects of cultural, artistic, scientific, or historical interest and make their collections or related exhibits available for public viewing. Also included are non-profit art galleries and university art galleries. Museums that exist only in cyberspace (i.e., virtual museums) are not included.

Defunct museums
 83 Mile House Farm Equipment Museum and Historic Site, 70 Mile House, contents auctioned off in 2012
 Bug Lab, New Westminster
 Centre of the Universe - Dominion Astrophysical Observatory, Saanich, closed in 2013, public star-gazing events on specified dates
 Granville Island Model Trains Museum, Vancouver, closed in 2008
 Granville Island Sport Fishing Museum, Vancouver
 New Westminster Police Museum, closed in 2015, displays now part of the New Westminster Museum
 The Niagara Falls Museum
 Royal London Wax Museum, Victoria, website, closed in 2010
 Storyeum, Vancouver

See also
Nature centres in British Columbia

References

 British Columbia Museums Association

 
British Columbia
Lists of buildings and structures in British Columbia